The Penmachno quarry (also known as Cwm Machno quarry, Rhiwfachno quarry, or Tan-y-Rhiw quarry) was a slate quarry near Cwm Penmachno, Conwy, North Wales. It was directly below the Rhiwbach Quarry. It was worked between 1818 and 1962.

History 

The quarry was originally known as the Tan-y-rhiw quarry, and it was recorded working in 1818.

By 1872, the quarry was employing 72 workers, rising to 178 in 1898 at its peak.

In 1909, the quarry stopped working for two weeks due to a general depression in the price of slates.

In 1937, Penmachno employed 108 quarrymen. It continued working after the Second World War, eventually closing in 1962.

Transport 
Unlike most Welsh slate quarries, it had no railway connection to the outside world, and most of the slate it produced was taken by horse-and-cart to a wharf on the River Conwy at Trefriw.

In the first decade of the 20th century a traction engine was purchased to haul the carts. This arrangement was later replaced by lorries. Some slate was hauled up to Rhiwbach Quarry and taken out to Blaenau Ffestiniog over the Rhiwbach Tramway. There were proposals to link Penmachno and Rhiwbach quarries by tramway, but these proposals were never implemented.

Internally, the quarry had a number of  gauge tramways and inclines. During the later years of operation a Motor Rail Simplex locomotive was purchased to work the lower tramway. Several proposals were made to connect the quarries by rail.

Geography 
The quarry was near the head of the isolated valley of the River Machno, above Penmachno village. Its height on the mountain meant it had a relatively restricted water supply, and on several occasions work stopped due to drought, including in 1891. It was worked as a series of galleried pits, as well as underground chambers.

The mills level, at the lower end, was at  elevation. There were originally two pits, the upper working was known as Rhiw Fachno and the lower one was the main Cwm Machno quarry. Adits lead into the mountain from both pits to access the underground workings.

Geology 
The five main veins of Ordovician slate that pass through Blaenau Ffestiniog are the North, Back, Narrow, Main (or Old) and South (or New) veins. As they head eastwards, the lower three thin out and disappear, so that by the time Cwt y Bugail Quarry is reached, only the North Vein and Back Vein are left. Immediately to the east of the Cwt y Bugail main adit, the strata are cut by the Dolwyddelan fault, and the same two veins re-appear at Rhiwbach and Penmachno, some  further to the south east, and at a considerably lower altitude.

Bardic chair 
The chair for the 2019 National Eisteddfod of Wales, held near Llanrwst, was made from slate from Penmachno quarry.

References

Slate mines in Conwy County Borough
Bro Machno
Railway inclines in Wales
Industrial railways in Wales
2 ft gauge railways in Wales